The Women's slalom competition of the Grenoble 1968 Olympics was held at Chamrousse.

The defending world champion was Annie Famose of France, who shared the  World Cup slalom championship with countrywoman Marielle Goitschel, who was also the leader of the 1968 World Cup.

Results

References 

Women's slalom
Alp
Oly